An , as defined by the Japanese government's Law for the Protection of Cultural Properties (1950), is a part of the Cultural Properties of high historical or artistic value such as drama, music, and craft techniques. The term refers exclusively to human skills possessed by individuals or groups which are indispensable to produce Cultural Properties.

Recognition is also given to the owners of an item to encourage its transmission. There are three types of recognition: individual recognition, collective recognition, and group recognition. Special grants of two million yen a year are given to individual holders (the so-called Living National Treasures) to help protect their properties. The government also contributes part of the expenses incurred either by the holder of an Intangible Cultural Property during training of his successor, or by a recognized group for public performances.

To promote the understanding, and therefore the transmission across generations, of Cultural Properties, exhibitions concerning them are organized. The government through the Japan Arts Council also holds training workshops and other activities to educate future generations of Noh, and kabuki personnel.

Important Intangible Cultural Properties

Performance Traditions

Crafts

See also
 For lists of holders of Important Intangible Cultural Properties, see List of Living National Treasures of Japan (crafts) and List of Living National Treasures of Japan (performing arts)
 Cultural Properties of Japan
 Intangible Cultural Heritage of the Philippines
 Important Intangible Cultural Properties of Korea
 UNESCO Intangible Cultural Heritage Lists

Notes

References

External links
  Cultural properties database 
  Department of Intangible Cultural Heritage
  Safeguarding Intangible Cultural Heritage in Japan
  JAANUS - dictionary of terms